Egg-eating snake can refer to six different species of snake, found within two genera:
Dasypeltis, the group of African egg-eating snakes
Indian egg-eating snake (Elachistodon westermanni)

Animal common name disambiguation pages
Biology disambiguation pages